Penthienate is an anticholinergic and has actions similar to atropine. It reduces gastric motility and secretion and is used for the treatment of peptic ulcer and dyspepsia.

References

Muscarinic antagonists
Thiophenes
Tertiary alcohols
Quaternary ammonium compounds
Carboxylate esters
Cyclopentyl compounds